Mesivtha Tifereth Jerusalem (MTJ) is a yeshiva in New York City, and one of the oldest existent yeshivas in the city. It is the institution formerly led by Rabbi Moshe Feinstein, and then led by his son Rabbi Dovid Feinstein until his death in November 2020. MTJ is now led by Rabbi Berel Feinstein.

Location
The yeshiva has two campuses. The older campus in Manhattan offers a full range of classes, from pre-kindergarten through post-high school. Rabbi Berel Feinstein succeeded his father, the late Rabbi Dovid Feinstein, who was Rabbi Moshe Feinstein's eldest son, as dean. This campus does not have a dormitory.

The second campus, also known as Yeshiva of Staten Island, is located in Staten Island and led by Rabbi Reuven Feinstein, Rabbi Moshe Feinstein's youngest son. The campus contains a high school, college, and post-college facilities; it has a dormitory.

History
Founded in 1907 at 87 Eldridge Street, the Talmud Torah Tifereth Jerusalem grew quickly. First moving to 115 Hester Street, then 240 Madison, then 13 Montgomery Street, the yeshiva finally settled in two adjacent lots on 145 and 147 East Broadway. The current structure was built in 1912. A high school was established in 1929.

The school was involved in a money laundering scandal in the 1980s.

Rabbi Michel Barenbaum became the mashgiach of the yeshiva shortly after the war. He died on March 4, 2003.

Staten Island's mashgiach, Rabbi Chaim Mintz, also founded and runs the kiruv organization Oorah.

Sports
The founder, Rabbi Feinstein was against attending sporting events, but MTJ "participated in competitive sporting events that included spectators."

References

External links
 Official website

1907 establishments in New York City
Education in Manhattan
Educational institutions established in 1907
Mesivtas
Orthodox yeshivas in New York City
Boys' schools in New York (state)
Moshe Feinstein